USS Albany (CA-123) was a United States Navy  heavy cruiser, later converted to the guided missile cruiser CG-10. The converted cruiser was the lead ship of the new Albany guided missile cruiser class. She was the fourth ship to carry the name Albany.

The ship was laid down on 6 March 1944 at Quincy, Massachusetts, by the Bethlehem Steel Company, launched on 30 June 1945, sponsored by Mrs. Elizabeth F. Pinckney, and commissioned on 15 June 1946 at the Boston Navy Yard.

Service history
Following outfitting and a shakedown cruise in the vicinity of Casco Bay, Maine, Albany began operations along the east coast of the United States punctuated with cruises to the West Indies. During the ensuing months, the cruiser made a number of voyages for the purpose of training naval reservists and NROTC midshipmen. Albany continued to perform such duty until 11 September 1948, when she stood out of Chesapeake Bay for her first tour of duty with the American naval forces operating in the Mediterranean Sea, recently made a permanent establishment as the 6th Fleet. That deployment set the tone for the next decade. The cruiser alternated five assignments to the 6th Fleet with operations along the east coast of the United States and in the West Indies and made three cruises to South American ports. During one of the South American voyages, Albany carried the official United States representative to the inauguration of the President of Brazil in January 1951.

For two years, stretching at least until the autumn of 1955, Albany served as flagship for Commander, Battleship-Cruiser Force, Atlantic.

Conversion to guided missile cruiser
On 30 June 1958, Albany was placed out of commission at the Boston Naval Shipyard to begin conversion to a guided missile cruiser. On 1 November 1958, she was redesignated CG-10. The warship spent the next four years at Boston undergoing very extensive modifications as part of the conversion; stripped down to her hull to be fitted with a new superstructure. Albany was recommissioned at Boston on 3 November 1962 with Captain Ben B. Pickett in command. For almost five years, she alternated deployments to European waters – both to the Mediterranean Sea and to the North Atlantic – with operations along the east coast and in the West Indies. During that time, the cruiser visited many foreign ports and participated in a number of exercises with units of friendly navies. On 1 March 1967, she was decommissioned at the Boston Naval Shipyard once again to undergo extensive modifications. Some 20 months later, on 9 November 1968, Albany was placed back in commission at Boston with Captain Allan P. Slaff in command. In 1973, the ship was again decommissioned for overhaul at the Philadelphia Naval Shipyard. It was recommissioned in May 1974 and homeported in Norfolk, VA under the command of Captain John J. Ekelund. Shortly thereafter, it became the flagship of the 2nd Fleet.

Between 1976 and 1980, Albany was the flagship of the 6th Fleet, and homeported in Gaeta, Italy.

Decommissioning and disposal
Albany was decommissioned on 29 August 1980 and laid up on the Elizabeth River across from the Norfolk Navy Yard. She was stricken from the Naval Vessel Register on 30 June 1985, but she remained at her berth and held for possible donation as a museum ship in her name sake city for a further 5 years. Though there was serious interest in saving the ship, a feasible museum and financial plan was never realized, and she was sold for scrapping on 12 August 1990.

Commemoration
A portion of Albanys bow resides at the Albany County Fairgrounds in Altamont, New York.

The original 14-foot-long (1:48 scale) brass model of the ship built by the United States Navy to help determine where antenna arrays would go on the actual-size ships was restored in 2013 and is on display at the Albany Heritage Area Visitors Center. USS Albany's bridge equipments like the ship wheel, clock, window, telephone, dining silver sets, items from crew members, shipbuilder plaque, bell, and more are all on display at USS Albany Heritage Exhibit.

Awards 

Navy Unit Commendation with 2 awards
Navy "E" Ribbon with 3 awards
World War II Victory Ribbon
World War II Occupation Medal with "Europe" clasp
National Defense Service Medal with 2 awards

Gallery

References

Bibliography

Further reading
Albany (Ship : CA-123). USS Albany CA-123: Mediterranean Cruise of 1951. [Place of publication not identified]: [publisher not identified], 1951. 
Albany (Ship : CA-123). The USS Albany: 1955 Mediterranean Cruise. [Place of publication not identified]: [publisher not identified], 1955.

External links

USS Albany Association homepage
Photos of Albany

Entry for Ekelund Range

 

Oregon City-class cruisers
Ships built in Quincy, Massachusetts
1945 ships
Albany-class cruisers
Cold War cruisers of the United States